Daniela Oronova (born 6 April 1965) is a Bulgarian rower. She competed at the 1988 Summer Olympics, 1992 Summer Olympics and the 1996 Summer Olympics.

References

External links
 

1965 births
Living people
Bulgarian female rowers
Olympic rowers of Bulgaria
Rowers at the 1988 Summer Olympics
Rowers at the 1992 Summer Olympics
Rowers at the 1996 Summer Olympics
Rowers from Sofia